Meowth ( or , known as  in the original Japanese version) is a Pokémon species in Nintendo and Game Freak's Pokémon franchise. Created by Ken Sugimori, Meowth first appeared in the video games Pokémon Red and Blue and subsequent entries in the franchise. In addition, it was one of the Pokémon to get an Alolan Form variant of the Dark type. It now also has a Galarian Form, which is a Steel type, and is the only Pokémon to have both an Alolan form and a Galarian form. It later appeared in various merchandise, spinoff titles and animated and printed adaptations of the franchise. A male Meowth capable of human speech is considered by many fans as Team Rocket's mascot because he is a member of the Team Rocket Trio, a group of antagonists in the anime comprising himself and two Team Rocket grunts called Jessie and James. Meowth is voiced by Inuko Inuyama in Japanese, and by Maddie Blaustein (dub episodes 33-419), and Jimmy Zoppi (dub episodes 420 – current) in English.

Known as the Scratch Cat Pokémon, it spends most of the daytime sleeping and prowls the city streets at night. Meowth evolves into Persian in Kanto and Alola and Perrserker in Galar. Meowth is considered as rival of the Pokémon mascot Pikachu and also has the opposite Pokédex number than that of Pikachu (its Pokédex number being 52 while Pikachu's is 25). Meowth is among the most recognizable Pokémon, largely because a member of the species is a central character in the Pokémon anime series. This particular Meowth, belonging to Team Rocket, the anime's main antagonists, is one of the few Pokémon that have the ability to speak human language. The episode "Go West Young Meowth" shows the character's backstory, in which Meowth attempted to impress a female Meowth called Meowzie ( in Japanese version) by teaching himself how to walk on two legs and speak human language, but it ended up alienating Meowzie.

In the English version of the franchise, Team Rocket's Meowth speaks with a Brooklyn accent. The character has received a mixed reception, Game Daily describing him as "adorable" while GamesRadar described it as "not all that useful" and said that Meowth as a species would not have stood out if it did not have such a large role in the anime.

Design and characteristics

Meowth was one of 151 different designs conceived by Game Freak's character development team and finalized by Ken Sugimori for the first generation of Pocket Monsters games Red and Green, which were localized outside Japan as Pokémon Red and Blue. Called "Nyarth" in Japanese, Nintendo decided to give the various Pokémon species "clever and descriptive names" related to their appearance or features when translating the game for western audiences as a means to make the characters more relatable to American children. 

Meowth has a distinctly feline appearance, resembling a small housecat. It has large whiskers. It has cream-colored fur, which turns brown at its toes and tail tip. Its oval-shaped head features prominent whiskers, black-and-brown ears, and a koban, a gold, oval coin (also known as a "charm") embedded in its forehead. Meowth are valued for their ability to collect coins using their signature move, "Pay Day", as it is the only Pokémon that learns it. Meowth's coloration, its love of coins, and its charm indicate that Meowth is based on the Japanese Maneki Neko, a cat-shaped figurine that is said to bring good luck and money to its owner. Aspects of Meowth were drawn from a Japanese myth dealing with the true value of money, in which a cat has money on its head but does not realize it. Meowth also draws inspiration from the Bakeneko, as, in Japan, its category is the Bakeneko Pokémon. When a Meowth receives enough experience from battles, it evolves into Persian at level 28.
Meowth is an urban nocturnal Pokémon, spending most of the daytime sleeping and prowling the city streets at night. They retract their claws back into their paws, which grants them silent movement and protecting them from leaving distinctively incriminating pawprints that alert people to their actions. Meowth loves round objects, as well as shiny, glittering things. The item it adores collecting the most, however, are coins, since they are both round and shiny. Meowth collects the objects at every opportunity and hoards in its nest. Murkrow, a Pokémon similar to the bowerbird, exhibits similar behavior and members of the two species have been known to steal from the collections of the other.

Appearances

In the video games
 
Meowth first appeared as a version exclusive Pokémon in Pokémon Blue. It later appeared in subsequent titles, including Pokémon Silver, Pokémon Crystal, the Red and Blue remakes Pokémon FireRed and LeafGreen, Pokémon Emerald, Pokémon Diamond, Pearl, and Platinum, Pokémon SoulSilver, Pokémon Black and White, Pokémon Black 2 and White 2, Pokémon X and Y, Pokémon Omega Ruby and Alpha Sapphire, Pokémon Sun and Moon, Pokémon Ultra Sun and Ultra Moon, Pokémon: Let's Go, Pikachu! and Let's Go, Eevee!, Pokémon Sword and Shield, and Pokémon Scarlet and Violet. Meowth is one of the playable characters in the Pokémon Mystery Dungeon games. Meowth also appears in the Nintendo 64 game Pokémon Snap, the Nintendo GameCube game Pokémon Channel, and many others. Meowth has appeared in every Super Smash Bros. game (including Melee, in which Team Rocket's Meowth appears as a trophy) as a Pokémon summoned via a Poké Ball item and uses its signature move, Pay Day, to throw a barrage of coins. In Pokémon Sun and Moon, Meowth has a unique Alolan Form, which is a Dark-type. Alolan Meowth were owned by Alolan royalty in the past, resulting in them having selfish and prideful attitudes, which caused their form to change. Pokémon Sword and Shield introduces another form of Meowth, including a new regional evolution. The original Kantonian Meowth has a unique Gigantamax form and its cry is Meowth's Japanese voice from the anime. In the Generation VIII games, the Galar Meowth's evolution line are described to be wildly savage and feral, and has a black forehead coin that is distinct from the other Meowth forms’ evolution lines. It also appeared in Pokémon Go and New Pokémon Snap.They also will make an appearance in Pokémon Masters during an Egg Event called “Meow Meow Meow”, where players can win battles to obtain eggs that will hatch into the three variants of Meowth, Kantonian, Alolan and Galarian, meaning the event will become the first time the player can obtain a Dark type Egg Pokémon, but also the first event where the player can get a regional variant of a Pokémon. During the event, all three variants of Meowth/Persian can be Shiny, but only their Tech versions.

In the anime
A specific male Meowth has made an appearance in almost every episode in the anime as the constant companion of Team Rocket agents Jessie and James, the show's bungling main antagonists. In the English version, he speaks with a Brooklyn accent. He originally lived in the Kantonian city of Hollywood (based on Hollywood, California), and tried to impress a female Meowth named Meowzie by learning to walk on two legs and speak human language. Instead of being impressed, she regarded him as a freak, so Meowth joined Team Rocket. Meowth was cloned in Pokémon: The First Movie, but his clone could not talk or walk on two legs, likely because Meowth needed to learn how to perform these actions. The Meowth clone is encountered again in Pokémon: Mewtwo Returns. In the episode "Meowth’s Scrafty Tactics!" Meowth temporarily joined the protagonists Ash, Iris, and Cilan, stating that he was fired from Team Rocket for his part in a failed mission, but in reality he was lying in order to gain their trust as part of an elaborate attempt to steal Pokémon from the Nimbasa City Pokémon Center. Despite his frequent appearances, Meowth is a wild Pokémon, which makes him eligible for capture. Iris, Ash’s travel companion, and Cliff, a forest ranger, attempted to capture him because they desired the convenience of a Pokémon that could translate to human language. However, since he does not wish to be owned by anyone, he refutes these attempts at capture.

Because Meowth exerted so much effort into being able to talk, he doesn't know how to perform Pay Day (his species' trademark move), and is permanently unable to do so. Pokémon Journeys: The Series revealed that he is capable of Gigantamaxing, which allows him to use his signature G-Max Move, G-Max Gold Rush.

A trainer named Tyson owns a Meowth, which beat Ash's Pikachu in the Ever Grande Conference. This Meowth was dressed up like Puss in Boots.

In other media
Team Rocket's Meowth appears in The Electric Tale of Pikachu manga series along with his teammates Jessie and James. He first appears in the chapter Pikachu's Excellent Adventure. In Days of Gloom and Glory, an unnamed Meowth based on Meowzie appears. Like in the anime, Meowzie finds Meowth's ability to speak human language "creepy". In the manga, she has at least one kitten, which she captures into a stolen Poké Ball to protect it from an impending flood. In the Pokémon Adventures manga, Meowth's first appearance is a cameo in the first chapter as one of the Pokémon that escapes from Professor Oak's Laboratory.

Meowth has appeared in the Pokémon Trading Card Game first in the Jungle series.  A special Meowth card was available with purchase of Pokémon Trading Card Game, a video game for the Game Boy Advance. In an open forum interview with ABC News, Pokémon anime director Masakazu Kubo noted Meowth as his favorite Pokémon, citing that while not a major presence in the games, he was in the anime. Meowth's voice actress at the time, Maddie Blaustein, provided her vocals for the character's appearance in Pokémon Live!

Reception

Critical response
Meowth ranked fourth on Game Daily'''s top 10 list of Nintendo characters that deserve their own games, describing him (presumably Meowth of the Team Rocket trio, rather than the species as a whole) as "adorable" and explaining that his intelligence and ability to speak gave him more depth than other Pokémon. IGN stated that without the anime, the species would not have been as famous, further describing the character of Team Rocket's Meowth as "probably the funniest part of the show". San Francisco Gate editor Jesse Hamlin stated that the trio's Meowth provided a few laughs in Pokémon The Movie 2000. However, another editor stated it was popular amongst people who have never seen the anime due to being a feline. Author Harry Schlesinger wrote that Meowth was popular among girls. Dale Bishir of IGN described Meowth as the most important Pokémon that impacted the franchise’s history, and further stated that the mascot of Team Rocket, Meowth has endured as the comic-relief of the trio and being one of the few Pokemon that can speak like humans. Steven Bogos of The Escapist listed Meowth as ninth of their favorite Pokemon, describing it as the most charismatic Pokemon of all time.

IGN said that Meowth of Team Rocket would make a good choice as a playable character in Super Smash Bros. Brawl: "if Brawl's developers really wanted much more representation for Pokemon as a franchise" also stating "it would be fun to face him in battle as a real fighter, just to be able to send him 'blasting off again.'" GamesRadar described Meowth as "not all that useful", and questioned if the species would have stood out if it were not for its portrayal in the anime.

GamesRadar editor Carolyn Gudmundson described Meowth as being "no slouch" compared to Snorlax, who she described as the greatest Pokémon ever. Fellow GamesRadar editor Justin Towell listed Meowth as one of video games' eight greatest cats, describing it as one of the most memorable species in the series. Authors Tracey West and Katherine Noll called Meowth the number one Normal type Pokémon and the tenth best Pokémon overall. They called its anime representation the "heart and soul of Team Rocket", and praised him as "funny and clever". WhatCulture included Meowth on 10 best gen 1 Pokemon.

Promotion
As one of the most popular characters from the Pokémon franchise, Meowth has been featured in various promotional events as well as collectible items. It was among eleven Pokémon selected as Japan's mascot for the 2014 FIFA World Cup. The Meowth balloon was also featured at the Saga International Balloon Fiesta which is always held in early November. In 2022, Meowth along with other feline Pokémon species was featured on a three-dimensional electronic billboard in Japan to commemorate International Cat Day which is celebrated in August.

Meowth's character image has been featured on ANA Boeing 747-400 registered JA8957 and Boeing 767-300 registered JA8288 and JA8357 along with several other Pokémon. In addition, he is also featured on the Boeing 777-300 with registration number JA754A. Alongside Pikachu, Meowth was featured in the Meitetsu 2200 series electric multiple unit serving the Nagoya region route in 2008, as part of the promotion for the film Pokémon: Giratina and the Sky Warrior. Meowth has also been made into several different toys, including action figures, dolls, and Funko Pops. Footwear manufacturer Converse is also celebrating the 25th anniversary of the Pokémon franchise in 2022 by creating a special edition called Converse x Pokémon First Partners Chuck Taylor All Star, with Meowth as one of the featured Pokémon.

Collectible cards featuring Meowth have appeared since the original Pokémon Trading Card Game released in October 1996. For the franchise's 25th anniversary, The Pokémon Company announced specially themed collectible cards, one of which is Meowth featuring with his Team Rocket partner Jessie and James. Meowth has also been used in promotional merchandise at fast food restaurant chains such as McDonald's and Burger King.

In popular culture
A Japanese foodie named Maki Kudo created a series of Pokémon-themed recipes, which were later released in a book called Pokémon Cookbook''. One of the recipes he made was "Meowth Mashed Potatoes" which is made from potatoes. Apart from that, Meowth is also an inspiration for other Pokémon-themed recipes.

References

External links

 Meowth on Bulbapedia
 Meowth on Pokemon.com

Characters in animated television series
Television characters introduced in 1997
Animated characters introduced in 1997
Fictional cats
Fictional characters who can manipulate darkness or shadows
Fictional characters with metal abilities
Fictional characters who can change size
Fictional criminals
Fictional thieves
Fictional gangsters
Nintendo antagonists
Pokémon species
Video game characters introduced in 1996

fr:Miaouss
pt:Família de Meowth